The 1939 SANFL Grand Final was an Australian rules football competition.   beat  124 to 77.

References 

SANFL Grand Finals
SANFL Grand Final, 1939